Mackwiller is a commune in the Bas-Rhin department in Grand Est in north-eastern France.

Archaeology
In 1955, substantial fragments of a large Mithraeum were unearthed in Mackwiller by Jean-Jacques Hatt, archaeologist and director of the Musée archéologique de Strasbourg.  The find is still prominently displayed in that museum.

See also
 Communes of the Bas-Rhin department

References

Communes of Bas-Rhin